This is a list of Danish television related events from 1992.

Events
29 February - Lotte Nilsson and Kenny Lübcke are selected to represent Denmark at the 1992 Eurovision Song Contest with their song "Alt det som ingen ser". They are selected to be the twenty-fifth Danish Eurovision entry during Dansk Melodi Grand Prix held at the Aalborghallen in Aalborg.

Debuts

Television shows

Births

Deaths

See also
1992 in Denmark